Lidiannis Echevarría Benítez (born 19 March 1996) is a Cuban volleyball player.

Echevarria was selected to play at the 2020 Olympic Games in Tokyo alongside Leila Martínez. The duo won two rounds 2-0.

Notes

References

External links 
 
 
 

Living people
1996 births
Cuban beach volleyball players
Women's beach volleyball players
Olympic beach volleyball players of Cuba
Beach volleyball players at the 2020 Summer Olympics
People from Artemisa